Bishara Addison is an American politician who served in the Ohio House of Representatives from Ohio's 9th district. She was appointed to the seat after incumbent Democrat Janine Boyd was appointed as a regional director of the United States Department of Health and Human Services in Region 5, which includes Ohio. Despite her appointment to fill Boyd's remaining term, she will not run for election to a full term in 2022.

References

Democratic Party members of the Ohio House of Representatives
21st-century American politicians
21st-century American women politicians
Politicians from Cleveland
Living people
Year of birth missing (living people)